The Beijing 1 (also known as the Beijing No 1 or Peking No 1 was a prototype twin-engined small airliner of the 1950s designed and built in the People's Republic of China. Only one example was built, the type not entering production.

Design and development
In 1958, the Beijing Aviation Institute (later to become known as the Beijing University of Aeronautics and Astronautics (BUAA) and now Beihang University) was instructed by Chinese Premier Zhou Enlai to design an airliner. The resulting design, the Beijing 1, was a small twin-engined low-wing cantilever monoplane with a retractable tricycle landing gear and of all metal construction.  It was powered by two  Ivchenko AI-14 driving two-bladed wooden propellers, while its wings were fitted with leading edge slats and trailing edge flaps to ease operations out of small airfields. A crew of two and 8 to 10 passengers were carried in the aircraft's fuselage.

The Beijing 1 made its maiden flight on 24 September 1958, and was handed over to the Chinese civil aviation authorities on 1 October 1958, the 9th anniversary of the establishment of the People's Republic of China. It was the first passenger airliner designed and built in the People's Republic.

Although contemporary reports suggested that the type entered service with Civil Aviation Administration of China, no production followed, with only the single prototype being built. It is now preserved at the Beijing Aviation Museum.

Specifications

Notes

References

 Andersson, Lennart. A History of Chinese Aviation: Encyclopedia of Aircraft and Aviation in China until 1949. Taipei, Republic of China: AHS of ROC, 2008. .
 "Asia's Aircraft Industries". Flight International, 26 July 1962. pp. 133–139.
 Gordon, Yefim and Dmitry Komissarov. Chinese Aircraft: China's Aviation Industry since 1951. Manchester, UK: Hikoki Publications, 2008. .
 Harrison, Neil. " A Peep into China..." Flight International, 21 May 1964. pp. 838–840.
Taylor, John W. R. Jane's All the World's Aircraft 1961–62. London: Sampson Low, Marston & Company, 1965.

1950s Chinese airliners